Lal Salam ( "Red salute") is a salute, greeting, or code word used by communists in South Asia. The word lal means "red" in Hindustani; salam means "peace" in Arabic.

In popular culture 
 Lal Salam (1990 film) is a film based in 1990 India in the Malayalam language. It is based on the lives of three actual communists in Kerala, South India: Mohanlal as Varghese Vaidyan, Murali as T. V. Thomas, and Smt K. R. Gowri Amma.
 Lal Salaam (2002 film), a Bollywood musical action drama film

Further reading 
 

Greeting words and phrases
Communism in Bangladesh
Communism in Pakistan
Communism in India